Jamal Plays Jamal is an album by American jazz pianist Ahmad Jamal featuring performances recorded in 1974 and released on the 20th Century label.

Critical reception
The Allmusic review awarded the album 4 stars stating "Jamal Plays Jamal epitomizes the commercial leanings and pop textures that dominate Ahmad Jamal's mid-'70s fusion efforts for the 20th Century label. Though his funkiest and most accessible recording to date, it nevertheless retains the melodic invention and intricacy of his more conventional jazz records".

Track listing
All compositions by Ahmad Jamal.
 "Eclipse" – 7:08 
 "Pastures" – 6:40 
 "Dialogue" – 8:43 
 "Spanish Interlude" – 7:17 
 "Death and Resurrection" – 4:43 
 "Swahililand" – 9:56

Personnel
Ahmad Jamal – piano, electric piano, synthesizer
Jamil Nasser – bass
Frank Gant – drums
Azzedin Weston – congas

References 

20th Century Fox Records albums
Ahmad Jamal albums
1974 albums